S. Sadhu Singh Thind is an Indian scholar and politician, most notable for serving the longest term as President of the District Congress Committee, Kapurthala, Punjab. He also served as an MLA from Sultanpur Lodhi. While serving as MLA, he was noted for repatriating the remains of Udham Singh from England to India in 1974.

References 

Indian National Congress politicians from Punjab, India
People from Kapurthala
Living people
Year of birth missing (living people)